The Warsaw Garrison Command (WGC) is a stand-alone military unit subordinate to the Ministry of National Defence charged with providing operational, logistic and security support for the Ministry and central command units of the Polish Armed Forces, based in Warsaw military district. Command's units also perform ceremonial duties during state visits, parades, other events and daily provide honour guarding of the Presidential Palace and the Tomb of Unknown Soldier.

The Command was established on 1 August 1995 as a sucessor of existing since 1967 Provisioning Units Group Command of the Ministry of National Defence. Warsaw Garrison Commander has been Brig. Gen. Tomasz Dominikowski since 1 October 2021. Command's headquarters are located at former Military Courts building (4 Piłsudski Square) in central Warsaw. April 19 is Command's celebration day in remembrance of appointment of the first City of Warsaw Commandant after a victory of Warsaw insurection in 1794.

Purpose
Warsaw Garrison Command supports the Ministry of National Defence (MoND), central command units of Polish Armed Forces (Polish General Staff, Armed Forces General Command, Armed Forces Operational Command) and other military units located within Warsaw garrison in order to enable their efficient and safe performence. Taksks performed by the soldiers subordinate to WGC include:
physical security including access control of Ministerial and military facilities
communication
logistic support including transport of persons

Subordinate units
Following military units are subordinate to the Warsaw Garrison Command:
 15th Sieradz Support of Command Brigade in Szieradz
 Security Regiment in Warsaw
 10th Wrocław Command Regiment in Wrocław
 10th Warsaw Automobile Regiment in Warsaw
 Representative Honour Guard Regiment of the Polish Armed Forces in Warsaw
 Warsaw Garrison Command Supportive Unit in Warsaw
 Supportive Unit in Warsaw
 Capital's Garrison Supportive Unit in Warsaw
 Military Physical Training Facility in Mrągowo
 24th Field Technical Base of Signal Troops in Opole
 Ministry of National Defence Representative Estate in Pruszków
 Warsaw Garrison Command Club – community center in Warsaw
 Special Publications' Printing House in Warsaw
Military bands subordinate to the Command are:
 Military Band in Elbląg
 Military Band in Giżyck
 Military Band in Lublin
 Military Band in Szczecin
 Military Band in Siedlce
 Military Band in Żagań
 Representative Band of the Polish Navy in Gdynia
 Military Band in Świnoujście
 Military Band in Koszalin
 Representative Band of the Polish Air Force in Poznań
 Representative Band of the Polish Land Forces in Wrocław
 Military Band in Bytom
 Military Band in Bydgoszcz
 Military Band in Toruń
 Military Band in Radom
 Military Band in Dęblin
 Representative Band of the Polish Armed Forces in Warsaw
 Military Band in Kraków
 Militay Band in Rzeszów

Leadership

Warsaw Garrison Commander – Brig. Gen. Tomasz Dominikowski (since 1 October 2021)

Gallery

References

External links

Military units and formations of Poland
Military units and formations established in 1995
1995 establishments in Poland
Army commands (military formations)
Polish Land Forces
Military areas of Poland